Leptohyphidae is a family of mayflies with some 140 described species in 12 genera.

References

Mayflies
Insect families